El Nuevo País is a Venezuelan newspaper. It was established by Rafael Poleo in 1988.

Rafael Poleo is also the current Director, with Luisa Salomón being the Chief of Newsroom. 
The newspaper is edited by Producciones Impretele, S.A., which is owned by Rafael Poleo and directed by Francisco Poleo as the Vice President Executive. Currently, according to the numbers of the newspaper's distributor El Universal, El Nuevo Pais is the second daily in regards of circulation and sells in Venezuela.

See also 
 List of newspapers in Venezuela

References

External links
Official website (shared with Zeta magazine)

1988 establishments in Venezuela
Mass media in Caracas
Newspapers published in Venezuela
Publications established in 1988
Spanish-language newspapers